Fernleigh may refer to:

Australia 
 Fernleigh, Caringbah South, a heritage-listed house in Caringbah South, Sydney, New South Wales
 Fernleigh, Cleveland, a heritage-listed cottage in Brisbane, Queensland
 Fernleigh Castle, a historic house in Sydney, New South Wales
 Fernleigh Park, a developed area of Googong, New South Wales
 Fernleigh Track, a multi-use rail trail near Belmont, New South Wales

Canada 
 Fernleigh, Nova Scotia, a subdivision within Halifax, Nova Scotia, Canada
 Fernleigh, Ontario, a community in the township of North Frontenac, Ontario, Canada

United States 
 Fernleigh, Virginia, an unincorporated community in Richmond County, Virginia, US

Buildings and structures disambiguation pages